William Storrie ( − 19 June 1900) was a businessman and politician in the early days of the colony of South Australia.

Born the third son of James Storrie of Glasgow, with brother James (ca.1829 – 16 July 1897) and sister Helen (died 25 November 1875) he emigrated to South Australia in 1849. He went into business for himself, then around 1864 brought in his brother to found the firm of W & J Storrie, agents, later wholesale hardware merchants of 19 Currie Street, Adelaide. He withdrew from active participation in the company but retained a financial interest. It was converted to a limited liability company, with brother-in-law W. T. Tassie appointed as manager.

Between 1867 and 1870 he contributed humorous articles in Scots dialect (as "Saunders McTavish") to The Adelaide Advertiser. They were published in book form in 1874.

He was elected a member of the Legislative Council in 1871, and retained his seat until 1878.

William Storrie married Jane McKenzie (died 30 November 1915 in Edinburgh, Scotland) on 14 June 1859. They had no children.

He left for England in 1897 and died in Barking, Essex.

References 

Members of the South Australian Legislative Council
Australian businesspeople
1900 deaths
Year of birth missing